Haematopotini is a tribe of horse flies, also known as clegs and deer flies, in the family Tabanidae.

Genera
BioLib includes:
Haematopota Meigen, 1803
Heptatoma Meigen, 1803
Hippocentrodes Philip, 1961
Hippocentrum Austen, 1908

References

External links

Tabanidae
Brachycera tribes
Taxa named by Joseph Charles Bequaert